Hong Kong Island South was a geographical constituency in the election for the Legislative Council of Hong Kong in 1995, which elects one member of the Legislative Council using the first-past-the-post voting system. The constituency covers Eastern District and Southern District on Hong Kong Island.

The constituency was merged into the Hong Kong Island constituency in 1998 after the handover of Hong Kong a year before.

Returned members
Elected members are as follows:

Election results

References 

Constituencies of Hong Kong
Hong Kong Island
Constituencies of Hong Kong Legislative Council
1995 establishments in Hong Kong
Constituencies established in 1995